Niedźwiednik may refer to the following places in Poland:
Niedźwiednik, Lower Silesian Voivodeship in Gmina Ziębice, Ząbkowice Śląskie County in Lower Silesian Voivodeship (SW Poland)
Niedźwiednik, a peak in the Krkonoše Mountains